Gennady Petrovich Kazmin (29 August 1934 – 28 January 2018) was a Soviet party worker, the first secretary of the Krasnoyarsk Territory Committee of the CPSU (1990–91), and the first secretary of the Khakass regional committee of the CPSU (1987–1990).

Early life
He was born on August 29, 1934, in the town of Valuiki, Belgorod region. In 20 years after the completion of the Novooskolsky Agricultural Technical School, mechanization was sent by the Komsomol voucher for the development of virgin lands in the Menderlino MTS of the Krasnoyarsk Territory. I worked at the MTS as a precinct mechanic, as a mechanic-controller. Was elected second, then - the first secretary of the Suhobuzim RK Komsomol.

Political career
In 1959, at the age of 25, he was elected chairman of the collective farm "Path of Lenin" in the same district. After the reorganization of the collective farms, he worked as the chief engineer of the Menderling sovkhoz, the director of the Zykovsky state farm of the Emelyanovsk district.

In December 1962 he was elected first secretary of the Uyar District Party Committee, in December 1967 he was elected first secretary of the Kansk District Party Committee.

In 1972 he was appointed head of the Krasnoyarsk Territorial Administration of State Farms, and was simultaneously elected a member of the executive committee of the Krasnoyarsk Territory Council.

Since January 1978 he worked as the first deputy chairman of the regional executive committee of the Khakas Autonomous Oblast.

In 1987 he was elected secretary, and from October 30, 1987 - first secretary of the Khakass regional committee of the CPSU.

August 26, 1990, was elected first secretary of the Krasnoyarsk Territory Committee of the CPSU.

On November 11, 1991, he terminated his powers in connection with the dissolution of the CPSU as a result of the August 1991 coup.

In subsequent years he worked as the general director in joint-stock companies "Enisejkuzlitmash" and "Krasnoyarsk-Conversion".

For 40 years he was elected deputy of the Krasnoyarsk Territory and Khakass regional councils. He was a People's Deputy of the USSR.

He graduated from the Krasnoyarsk Agricultural Institute and the Moscow Higher Party School.

Sources 
 http://my.krskstate.ru/docs/secretary_kpss/kazmin-gennadiy-petrovich/
 https://web.archive.org/web/20170803213704/http://www.gornovosti.ru/tema/history/posledniy-sovetskiy-gubernator444445546.htm

1934 births
2018 deaths
People from Kursk Oblast
People from Valuyki, Belgorod Oblast
Communist Party of the Soviet Union members
Members of the Congress of People's Deputies of the Soviet Union
Russian State Social University alumni
Recipients of the Order of Lenin
Recipients of the Order of the Red Banner of Labour
Russian politicians